The Rovte Hills (also known as Logatec–Žiri Rovte, Logaško-Žirovske Rovte) are a group of hills in western Slovenia.

Geography
The Rovte Hills are a hilly prealpine area between the Žiri Basin and the Logatec Karst Field through which the Škofja Loka Hills and Polhov Gradec Hills transition into the karst area of the Idrija Hills, Hotedršica Lowland, and Logatec Basin. The hills are named after Rovte, which is the largest settlement in the area. Most of the area is part of the Ljubljanica and Sora watersheds, and a smaller portion is part of the Idrijca watershed. Many creeks rise in the central part of the hills, composed of impermeable rock. These include Sovra Creek, Rovtarica Creek, Hotenjka Creek, and White Creek, and they have carved ravines into the hills. Rounded hills rise above them, with typical names such as Marinc Hill, Bear Hill, and Grass Peak, as well as small karstified plateaus. Permeable rock predominates on the margins of the hills, where larger watercourses have carved deep valleys. The highest point in the Rovte Hills is Three Kings Peak.

History
The Rovte Hills were not settled until the late Middle Ages. Isolated farms were created in clearings, followed by hamlets and dispersed villages. The oldest settlements in the hills include Vrh Svetih Treh Kraljev, Hleviše, Zaplana, and Medvedje Brdo.

Peaks
The highest are:
Three Kings Peak
Čemun Peak
Kovk Hill
Jelenšek Hill
Ulovka Hill

References 

Hills of Slovenia